The Junior men's race at the 1978 IAAF World Cross Country Championships was held in Glasgow, Scotland, at the Bellahouston Park on March 25, 1978.   A report on the event was given in the Glasgow Herald.

Complete results, medallists, 
 and the results of British athletes were published.

Race results

Junior men's race (7.036 km)

Individual

Teams

Note: Athletes in parentheses did not score for the team result

Participation
An unofficial count yields the participation of 91 athletes from 16 countries in the Junior men's race, one athlete less than the official number published.

 (5)
 (6)
 (6)
 (6)
 (6)
 (5)
 (6)
 (6)
 (5)
 (6)
 (6)
 (6)
 (5)
 (5)
 (6)
 (6)

See also
 1978 IAAF World Cross Country Championships – Senior men's race
 1978 IAAF World Cross Country Championships – Senior women's race

References

Junior men's race at the World Athletics Cross Country Championships
IAAF World Cross Country Championships
1978 in youth sport